The 1903 Florida hurricane was an Atlantic hurricane that caused extensive wind and flood damage on the Florida peninsula and over the adjourning Southeastern United States in early to mid September 1903. The third tropical cyclone and third hurricane of the season, this storm was first observed near Mayaguana island in the Bahamas early on September 9. Moving northwestward, it became a hurricane the next day and passed near Nassau. The cyclone then turned to the west-northwest on September 11 and passed just north of the Bimini Islands. As it crossed the Bahamas, the cyclone produced hurricane-force winds that caused damage to crops and buildings, but no deaths were reported over the island chain.

Late on September 11, the cyclone struck near Fort Lauderdale, Florida. The Inchulva capsized near Delray Beach, drowning nine of her crew members. The cyclone caused severe wind damage in present-day Broward and Palm Beach counties, although most of the losses were to crops such as sugarcane. The cyclone weakened to a tropical storm while crossing Florida, but re-intensified into a hurricane over the Gulf of Mexico on September 17. In Northwest Florida, Alabama, and Georgia, the cyclone produced widespread rainfall, causing some crop damage. Additionally, a storm surge caused boats to be blown ashore in the Florida Panhandle. In all, the storm killed 14 people in Florida and produced $500,000 in damage. After falling to tropical storm intensity early on September 14, the storm weakened to a tropical depression on September 16, several hours before dissipating over South Carolina.

Meteorological history

Based upon scientific research conducted by the National Oceanographic and Atmospheric Administration's Hurricane Research Division in 2003, the cyclone is estimated to have first begun as a  tropical storm south of Mayaguana in the Bahamas early on September 9. However, due to scarce observations, its genesis likely occurred earlier than this time but was undetected operationally. Turning to the west-northwest, the cyclone maintained its intensity while passing just north of the Bimini Islands. Thereafter, the hurricane weakened upon crossing the Everglades, weakening to a tropical storm at 06:00 UTC on September 12.

At this time, the cyclone was still moving west-northwest as it had started nearly two days earlier. Although diminished in intensity after its passage over the Florida peninsula, the cyclone quickly re-organized and began to re-intensify over the Gulf of Mexico. On the afternoon of September 13, the hurricane passed just west of Cape San Blas, but did not strike there. As its heading backed to the north-northwest, the cyclone moved made landfall near Panama City at the same intensity around 00:00 UTC on September 14. After moving inland, the cyclone rapidly diminished to a strong tropical storm and continued to weaken as it entered southern Alabama early on September 14. The next day, it turned northeast and then east-northeast, and by 00:00 UTC on September 16, it degenerated into a tropical depression. Less than 24 hours later, the system dissipated just east of the Georgia–South Carolina border.

Preparations
These were later upgraded to hurricane warnings in South Florida. Due to inclement weather conditions in West Palm Beach, which had been newly incorporated as a town just days earlier, businesses suspended their normal operations and people boarded up buildings, even as the strongest winds arrived. As the cyclone moved into the Gulf of Mexico, reports from September 12 through September 14 helped ships prepare for the storm.

Impact
In the Bahamas, the cyclone produced a barometric pressure at or below  on Cat Cay for about 10 hours beginning at 11:00 UTC on September 11. The entire storm practically ceased by 23:00 UTC late that day. Only  of rain attended the passage of the hurricane on the island. On the island, the hurricane destroyed the fruit crop and caused considerable damage to small structures. The storm also caused heavy damage to local shipping.

In southeast Florida, no wind or pressure observations were available within  of the location where the eye of the cyclone struck the coast. Only pineapple sheds were damaged at Jupiter.

In West Palm Beach, as northeast winds reached their peak between 21:00 UTC on September 11 and 01:00 UTC the next day, parts of buildings blew away. Many buildings were unroofed, while rainfall and winds subsequently caused further damage to the interiors, such as at The Tropical Sun office building, the Seminole Hotel, the Palms Hotel, Schmid's Commercial Hotel, and properties owned by former mayor Marion E. Gruber. Several other businesses suffered similar damage. Much debris, including roofing materials, branches, paper, and driftwood, was thrown into the streets. In the African American section of the town, several buildings were destroyed. Just one of the four churches stood after the hurricane. Damage there ran "way up in the thousands."

Hotels on the nearby island of Palm Beach survived, but many coconut palms and other vegetation were prostrated. On the west shoreline of Lake Worth Lagoon, homes were swept off their foundations and their interiors flooded. Coconut trees and shrubbery were also toppled on Munyon Island. All three of the cottages were blown into the Lake Worth Lagoon, while the hotel also suffered some damage. The Lake Worth News building in Lake Worth was severely damaged by flooding. Destruction in Boynton Beach was "almost indescribable." Dozens of homes were damaged to some degree. The ground was "literally covered" with fruit, including guava, lemons, and lime, while pineapple fields were flattened. Power and telegraph lines and trees, including many large pine trees, were toppled throughout the city. Offshore, a Standard Oil barge was beached against a reef; the crew of eleven men were forced to swim ashore.

The settlements of Pompano, where the eye was believed to have come ashore, and Delray Beach were nearly destroyed, with trees defoliated and many buildings dismantled. Offshore Delray Beach, the British steamship Inchulva, wrecked near the Orange Grove House of Refuge. The wreck was later salvaged and transformed into an underwater diving attraction. Damage in the Miami area was mainly confined to small buildings overturned, trees uprooted, smokestacks downed, metal awnings broken, and metal roofs scattered. Only two or three homes were blown off their foundations in the northern part of the area. At the new building for The Miami Metropolis, the wall on the west side collapsed. Telegraph and electrical lines were downed throughout the city, leaving the streets "a tangle of wires." The loss of electricity was restored by the night of September 12. Damage in South Florida reached $100,000, mainly to crops such as sugarcane in the Everglades.

In Central Florida, the cyclone only caused minor damage to structures and blew down trees, but at least two people died in Tampa. The storm also damaged businesses in the area and reportedly blew down half the local orange crop. Up to 50% of the cotton crop was destroyed, but overall structural damage was minor, though ships were grounded near Apalachicola. Minor crop damage occurred in low-lying areas, but advance warning reduced the potential damage. In all, the hurricane killed 14 people, all in Florida.

See also

 1932 Florida–Alabama hurricane
 Hurricane Erin (1995)
 List of Florida hurricanes (1900–49)

Notes

References

Bibliography
 Barnes, Jay (2007). Florida's Hurricane History. Chapel Hill Press. .
 Kleinberg, Eliot (2003). Black Cloud: The Deadly Hurricane of 1928. Carroll and Graf Publishing. .

F (1903)
Category 1 Atlantic hurricanes
Hurricanes in the Bahamas
Hurricanes in Florida
1903 meteorology
1903 natural disasters in the United States
1903 in Florida